is a Japanese video game developer and battle designer working for Square Enix. He was one of the directors for Chrono Trigger and worked on several battle systems for the Final Fantasy series.

Career
After finishing his work on Romancing SaGa 2, Matsui joined the development of Chrono Trigger midway through. He was responsible for planning and the movements of monsters in battles. Since 2000, Matsui has been a member of the production staff for the MMORPG Final Fantasy XI, where he was in charge of the battle system. He became the director of the game's ongoing development in September 2010 but was succeeded by Mizuki Ito two months later. Matsui was switched to the Final Fantasy XIV team as lead combat system designer following the game's unsuccessful launch. When Final Fantasy XI producer Hiromichi Tanaka left the company in August 2012, Matsui was chosen to fill the position in his place.

Works

References 

Living people
Year of birth missing (living people)
Final Fantasy designers
Japanese video game directors